Geoff Leigh McMillan (22 May 1958 – 25 December 2001) was  a former Australian rules footballer who played with Richmond in the Victorian Football League (VFL).

In 1980 he moved to play for Norwood in the South Australian National Football League, but only played a single game before injury prevented him from further games.

He died in 2001 from a brain tumour.

Notes

External links 
		

1958 births
2001 deaths
Australian rules footballers from Victoria (Australia)
Richmond Football Club players
Norwood Football Club players